Jason Johnson (born December 7, 1979) is a former professional American football quarterback who played three seasons with the Edmonton Eskimos of the Canadian Football League (CFL) and also two seasons in Europe Austrian Football League and Italian Football League.

Johnson played college football at the University of Arizona and attended Rogers High School in Puyallup, Washington. While at Arizona, he earned two all conference honors and he would break many school records including most passing yards in a game. He won the 2001 Woody Hayes Award as the top male scholar-athlete in Division I sports. 

He was a member of the Edmonton Eskimos team that won the 93rd Grey Cup. Johnson served as quarterbacks coach of the Pacific Lutheran Lutes from 2010 to 2011. 

Johnson also played for the Swarco Raiders of the Austrian Football League in 2009. The Raiders lost in the Austrian league semi final, but Johnson helped the Raiders to win the European championship Euro Bowl XXIII defeating the La Courneuve Flash of France 30-19.
 He played for the Catania Elephants of the Italian Football League in 2008 and led the league in passer rating and touchdown passes.

References

External links
Just Sports Stats
College stats
Arizona Wildcats bio
totalfootballstats.com
Fanbase profile

Living people
1979 births
Players of American football from Tacoma, Washington
American football quarterbacks
Canadian football quarterbacks
American players of Canadian football
Arizona Wildcats football players
Edmonton Elks players
Pacific Lutheran Lutes football coaches
American expatriate sportspeople in Italy
American expatriate players of American football
American expatriate sportspeople in Austria